Nightmare is the fifth studio album by American heavy metal band Avenged Sevenfold, released on July 23, 2010, through Warner Bros. Records. It was produced by Mike Elizondo, mixed in New York City by audio engineer Andy Wallace, and mastered by Ted Jensen.

Nightmare is Avenged Sevenfold's first album to be recorded without Jimmy "The Rev" Sullivan performing drums due to his death in December 2009. However, he did write parts that were used for the final recordings, making this the last album he would write on, and his vocal takes are still on the album as a tribute to him. The rest of the drum tracks were handled by Dream Theater drummer Mike Portnoy, who also played with the band for all their tours through the end of 2010. They then hired drummer Arin Ilejay, who played with the band from 2011 to 2015.

The album debuted at number one in the Billboard 200 in the United States and was certified Gold by the BPI and Platinum by the both the RIAA and Music Canada. As of December 2016, the album has sold 964,000 copies in the United States. The cover of the album features a tribute to Jimmy "The Rev" Sullivan, the tombstone reads "FOREVER" with emphasis on "REV".

Writing and recording
In late 2009, two years after Avenged Sevenfold released their self-titled album, and four years after they had issued their breakthrough studio set, 2005's City of Evil, the band started working on their next record, their "most personal and epic that will definitely take you on a very dark journey." However, as recording was in session, a few casualties arose.

On December 28, 2009, drummer Jimmy Sullivan (a.k.a. The Rev) died. Afterwards, the band suspended work on the album for some time. Not wanting to hire a permanent replacement for The Rev for the time being, the band selected Mike Portnoy of Dream Theater (a major influence on The Rev and the rest of the band) to finish recording the drum tracks for the album:

After a couple of months, more notices about the album became available; a short message from Zacky Vengeance was posted on the official Avenged Sevenfold Twitter on April 17, 2010: "Tracking is complete. There are no words that will ever describe the feeling of listening to this album while driving home alone at 4 am."

Johnny Christ stated in an interview with Ultimate Guitar about the writing process and subject matter of Nightmare:

M. Shadows and Synyster Gates, in an interview with The Pulse of Radio, confirmed The Rev's special appearance in the record. According to the band members, he left a couple of vocals (to their fortune, clear and in key) before his death, which they used on the record. With his drum fills and vocals intact, the record showed itself to be the band's last record with The Rev. The same band members revealed some details about the new record in an interview to Hard Drive radio:

Every song on the album had writing contributions from The Rev.

Release and promotion
The first single, "Nightmare", was released digitally on May 18, 2010. The song was leaked on May 6, 2010 on Amazon.com, but was removed soon after; however, on May 10, 2010, a 30-second audio uncensored sample was again revealed, but this time at SoundCloud and on the band's official website. The same day, the band also posted a video of the song on their official YouTube channel with animated lyrics, which received over 275,000 plays in 24 hours.

On June 3, 2010, the band revealed a "Limited Edition" of Nightmare for pre-order available only on their website, which contains:
 Full Nightmare album on CD.
 Expanded booklet featuring lyric sheets from the band and exclusive artwork.
 Housed in a synthetic leather bound book with special silver-plated Nightmare crest.
 Limited 24″ x 36″ lithograph entitled Death Bat Anatomy, featuring original artwork on special textured paper embossed with a silver colored Death Bat.
 Instant download of the new single, Nightmare.

Since May 27, 2010, the band revealed the album cover piece by piece like a jigsaw puzzle over a period of eighteen days, revealing the complete cover on June 14, 2010, along with the track listing.

On June 29, 2010, the band made available an iTunes pre-order of the album, which contains:
Full Nightmare digital album.
Bonus track: "Lost It All"
Exclusive photos.
"Nightmare" music video.
Behind the scenes footage from "Nightmare" music video shoot.
Written treatment for "Nightmare" music video.
"Nightmare" lyric video.
Audio interview with album producer, Mike Elizondo.
Type-set lyrics with hand-written notes for bonus track, "Lost It All".
Sketches of album art concept.

The song "Buried Alive" was posted on the band's Facebook page on July 14, 2010, but experienced loading issues due to a large number of users trying to access the video, and was briefly taken down. The problem was resolved on July 15, 2010, and was posted on YouTube as a lyric video which also contained a small animation.

On July 21, 2010, the song "So Far Away" was released by KROQ radio exclusively for one day.

On October 19, 2010, the single "Welcome to the Family" was released.

On April 5, 2011, "So Far Away" was released, followed by the music video.

In September 2011, the band announced plans for a music video for their next single, "Buried Alive". They tried to get Rob Zombie to direct the video, but he declined due to being focused on another project.

Critical reception
{{Album ratings
| MC = 62/100
| rev1 = 411Mania.com
| rev1Score = 
| rev2 = AllMusic
| rev2Score = 
| rev3 = The A.V. Club
| rev3Score = C− 
| rev5 = Billboard
| rev5Score = 
| rev6 = Metal Hammer
| rev6Score =  
| rev7 = Rock Sound
| rev7Score = 
| rev8 = Sputnikmusic
| rev8Score=  
| rev9 = USA Today
| rev9Score = 
| rev10 = Crave Online
| rev10score = 1/10
}}Nightmare received generally positive reviews from music critics. At Metacritic, which assigns a normalized rating out of 100 to reviews from mainstream critics, the album received an average score of 62, based on 7 professional reviews, which indicates "generally favorable reviews".

In the August 2010 issue of Metal Hammer, Terry Beezer rated the album an eight out of ten. In his review, he had praised the band members for their courage despite the death of The Rev and called it "the ultimate tribute to a fallen friend." He also praised Mike Portnoy for his part in the album and found him a fitting stand-in for The Rev.

411 Mania gave the record a lengthy but highly positive review by giving it a score of 9.0/10. As a conclusion they stated, "If you're a fan of Avenged Sevenfold, Nightmare is a must-have for you. This album is incredibly moving and is better than any tribute to the late Rev I could have possibly imagined."Kerrang! gave the album 4 K's out of 5 concluding: "Where Avenged [Sevenfold] go from here is still in the lap of the gods. Whatever their future, though, Nightmare'' marks the point at which the Huntington Beach crew put away childish things and became men. Wherever he is now, their brother must be immensely proud."

Accolades

Track listing

Personnel

Avenged Sevenfold
 M. Shadows – lead vocals, piano
 Zacky Vengeance – rhythm guitar, acoustic guitar, backing vocals
 The Rev – drum arrangement, co-lead vocals on "Fiction", growl on "Save Me", drums and backing vocals on "Nightmare" demo
 Synyster Gates – lead guitar, backing vocals
 Johnny Christ – bass guitar

Session musicians
 Mike Portnoy – drums, percussion
 Brian Haner, Sr. – guitar solo on "Tonight the World Dies", additional guitars on "So Far Away"
 Sharlotte Gibson – backing vocals on "Victim"
 Jessi Collins – backing vocals on "Fiction"
 David Palmer – piano on "Nightmare", "Danger Line", "Fiction" and "Save Me", keyboards on "Danger Line" and "Save Me", B3 on "Tonight the World Dies" and "Fiction"
 Stevie Blacke – strings, string arrangement on "Nightmare", "Danger Line", "Buried Alive", "So Far Away", "Fiction" and "Save Me"
 Stewart Cole – trumpet on "Danger Line"
 The Whistler – whistling on "Danger Line"

Production
 Mike Elizondo – producer, keyboards on "Fiction"
 Craig Aaronson – A&R
 Brent Arrowood – assistant engineer
 Chad Carlisle – assistant engineer
 D.A. Frizell – illustrations, treatment
 Adam Hawkins – engineer
 Andy Wallace – mixer
 Ted Jensen – mastering
 Jodie Levine – production co-ordination, contractor
 Clay Patrick McBride – photography
 Andy Olyphant – A&R
 Paul Suarez – pro-tools
 Jan Petrow – assistant engineer
 Cam Rackman – paintings, portraits
 Rafa Alcantra – art direction, photography, layouts
 Travis Smith – cover art, tray card art
 Joanna Terrasi – production co-ordination, contractor

Charts

Weekly charts

Year-end charts

Certifications

Release history

CD

References

External links

Warner Bros. Records

Avenged Sevenfold albums
2010 albums
Albums published posthumously
Warner Records albums
Albums produced by Mike Elizondo
Albums with cover art by Travis Smith (artist)